Local elections was held in the Province of Quezon on May 13, 2019 as part of the 2019 general election.  Voters selected candidates for all local positions: a town mayor, vice mayor and town councilors, as well as members of the Sangguniang Panlalawigan, the vice-governor, governor and representatives for the four districts of Quezon.

Provincial elections
The candidates for governor and vice governor with the highest number of votes wins the seat; they are voted separately, therefore, they may be of different parties when elected. Governor David C. Suarez is term-limited and will be running as congressman. He later left the National Unity Party and assumed chairmanship for the Nacionalistas in the province. The Nacionalista Party and Lakas–CMD is in coalition this elections to support Minority Floor Leader and 3rd District Congressman Danilo Suarez for governor and the incumbent Samuel Nantes for vice governor. The Nacionalista Party is currently the largest political party in the province, with incumbents as its members. PDP–Laban will support 2nd District Congressman Vicente Alcala for governor and his candidates. Congressman Alcala is supported by his ally, PDP–Laban local president, Vitaliano Aguirre II. The former Justice secretary is also a political nemesis of the Suarezes in Bondoc Peninsula. The Liberal Party and Aksyon Demokratiko will support Alcala for governor, despite leaning to the opposition. The  Nationalist People's Coalition will not support any candidate for governor as most members are split with their alliances.

Gubernatorial election
Parties are as stated in their certificate of candidacies.

David Suarez is term-limited.

Vice-gubernatorial election
Parties are as stated in their certificate of candidacies.

Samuel Nantes is the incumbent.

Congressional elections

1st District
Incumbent Representative Katrina Enverga was withdrew her candidacy in favor to her brother former Representative Mark Enverga.

2nd District
Incumbent Representative Vicente Alcala is running for Governor, his party (PDP–Laban) nominates his brother former Representative Proceso Alcala, his opponent is outgoing Governor David Suarez.

3rd District
Incumbent Representative Danilo Suarez is running for Governor, his wife Aleta, is his party nominee. Rodolfo "Rudy" Aguirre of PDP–Laban, the brother of former Justice Secretary Vitaliano Aguirre withdrews.

4th District
Angelina Tan is the incumbent and is running unopposed.

Provincial board elections

1st District

2nd District

3rd District

4th District

Lucena City local elections
This refers to the candidates and winners of the 2016 election in the highly urbanized city of Lucena, independent from the province.

Mayoralty elections
Mayor Roderick Alcala and Vice Mayor Philip Castillo are the incumbents.

City council elections

City and municipal elections
Source:

1st District, Candidates for Mayor 
City: Tayabas City
Municipalities: Burdeos, General Nakar, Infanta, Jomalig, Lucban, Mauban, Pagbilao, Panukulan, Patnanungan, Polillo, Real, Sampaloc

Tayabas City
Aida Reynoso is the incumbent.

Burdeos
Freddie Aman is the incumbent.

General Nakar
Elisio Ruzol is the incumbent.

Infanta
Filipina Grace America is the incumbent.

Jomalig
Rodel Tena is the incumbent mayor.

Lucban
Oli Dator is the incumbent mayor

Mauban
Fernando 'Dingdong' Llamas is term-limited.

Pagbilao
Shierre Ann Palicpic is the incumbent mayor

Panukulan
Amado Peñamora is the incumbent, but not running for mayor.

Patnanungan
Derick Larita is the incumbent mayor.

Polillo
Cristina Bosque is the incumbent.

Real
Bing Aquino is the incumbent mayor.

Sampaloc
Gelo Devanadera is the incumbent mayor, running unopposed

2nd District, Candidates for Mayor 
City: Lucena City
Municipalities: Candelaria, Dolores, San Antonio, Sariaya, Tiaong

Candelaria
Macky Boongaling is the incumbent mayor.

Dolores
Mario Milan Jr. is the incumbent mayor.

San Antonio
Erick Wagan is the incumbent mayor.

Sariaya
Marcelo Gayeta is the incumbent mayor.

Tiaong
Ramon Preza is the incumbent mayor.

3rd District, Candidates for Mayor
Municipalities: Agdangan, Buenavista, Catanauan, General Luna, Macalelon, Mulanay, Padre Burgos, Pitogo, San Andres, San Francisco, San Narciso, Unisan

Agdangan
Rhadam Aguilar is the incumbent mayor.

Buenavista
Alexander Rivera is the incumbent, running unopposed.

Catanauan
Ramon Orfanel is the incumbent mayor.

General Luna
Stevenson Sangalang is the incumbent, but running for vice mayor.

Macalelon
Nelson Traje is the incumbent mayor.

Mulanay
Joselito A. Ojeda is term-limited.

Padre Burgos
Mayor Roger Panganiban is term-limited.

Pitogo
Paulino Sayat is the incumbent mayor.

San Andres
Serson Emprese is the acting mayor.

San Francisco

San Narciso
Pobel Uy-Yap is the incumbent mayor.

Unisan
Nonato Puache is term-limited as mayor.

4th District, Candidates for Mayor
Municipalities: Alabat, Atimonan, Calauag, Guinayangan, Gumaca, Lopez, Perez, Plaridel, Quezon, Tagkawayan

Alabat
FM Alandy Mesa is the incumbent mayor.

Atimonan
Rustico Joven Mendoza is the incumbent, running unopposed.

Calauag
Mayor Luisito Visorde is term-limited.

Guinayangan
Boyboy Isaac is the incumbent mayor.

Gumaca
Mayor Erwin Caralian is term-limited.

Lopez
Rachel Ubaña is the incumbent mayor.

Perez
Pepito Reyes is the incumbent mayor.

Plaridel
Bernard Tumagay is the incumbent mayor.

Quezon
Crispin Clacio is the incumbent mayor

Tagkawayan

References 

Elections in Quezon
2019 Philippine local elections
Politics of Quezon
May 2019 events in the Philippines
2019 elections in Calabarzon